The Louis and Ellen Olson House, a  Craftsman style mansion built in 1903, is located near downtown Enumclaw, Washington, United States.  It has been listed on the National Register of Historic Places since 1984.  The mansion is currently a private residence.

References

American Craftsman architecture in Washington (state)
Buildings and structures in Enumclaw, Washington
History of King County, Washington
Houses completed in 1903
Houses in King County, Washington
Houses on the National Register of Historic Places in Washington (state)
Landmarks in King County, Washington 
National Register of Historic Places in King County, Washington
1903 establishments in Washington (state)